John Denham (by 1530-56 or later), of Cossington, Somerset, was an English Member of Parliament.
He was a Member (MP) of the Parliament of England for Shaftesbury in April 1554.

References

16th-century births

Year of birth unknown
Year of death unknown
English MPs 1554
People from Shaftesbury